East End Cemetery is an historic African-American cemetery located at 50 Evergreen Rd., in the East End of Richmond, Virginia.

History
Founded in 1897 by a group of prominent black citizens of the city of Richmond, East End Cemetery was originally incorporated as Greenwood Cemetery in 1891. It straddles the border between the city of Richmond and Henrico County. Colored Pauper's Cemetery lies to its west, and Evergreen Cemetery to its south.

Internments
East End Cemetery is estimated to contain 17,500 burials.

Notable burials include:
 Rosa Dixon Bowser, educator and journalist
 Richard Fillmore Tancil, doctor and community leader

References

External links
East End Cemetery, Richmond, Virginia
Friends of East End
Evergreen and East End Cemeteries
Find a Grave - East End Cemetery

Cemeteries in Richmond, Virginia
African-American cemeteries in Virginia
African-American history in Richmond, Virginia
History of slavery in Virginia
African-American historic places